A dead metaphor is a figure of speech which has lost the original imagery of its meaning by extensive, repetitive, and popular usage. Because dead metaphors have a conventional meaning that differs from the original, they can be understood without knowing their earlier connotation. Dead metaphors are generally the result of a semantic shift in the evolution of a language, a process called the literalization of a metaphor. A distinction is often made between those dead metaphors whose origins are entirely unknown to the majority of people using them (such as the expression "to kick the bucket") and those whose source is widely known or symbolism easily understood but not often thought about (the idea of "falling in love"). 

The long standing metaphorical application of a term can similarly lose their metaphorical quality, coming simply to denote a larger application of the term.  The wings of a plane now no longer seem to metaphorically refer to a bird's wings; rather, the term 'wing' was expanded to include non-living things. Similarly, the legs of a chair is no longer a metaphor but an expansion of the term "leg" to include any supporting pillar.  

There is debate among literary scholars whether so-called "dead metaphors" are dead or are metaphors. Literary scholar R.W. Gibbs noted that for a metaphor to be dead, it would necessarily lose the metaphorical qualities that it comprises. These qualities, however, still remain. A person can understand the expression "falling head-over-heels in love" even if they have never encountered that variant of the phrase "falling in love". Analytic philosopher Max Black argued that the dead metaphor should not be considered a metaphor at all, but rather classified as a separate vocabulary item.

Examples

 Time is running out (in reference to an hourglass)
 Roll up the window
 Hang up the phone
 Face and hands on a clock
 Fly off the handle
 Body of an essay
 Deadline
 Brand new
 Go belly up
 Laughing stock
 Glove compartment
 Cut! (in film)
 To tape something (record)
 Hold your horses
 Dialing a phone
 Sound like a broken record
 Rewind
 Patching up code
 Footage (in film)

References

Metaphors by type